Sydney Lambert (11 October 1852 – 10 October 1916) was a New Zealand cricketer. He played three first-class matches for Otago between 1873 and 1875.

See also
 List of Otago representative cricketers

References

External links
 

1852 births
1916 deaths
New Zealand cricketers
Otago cricketers